The Théâtre Golovine is a dance theatre in Avignon established in 1975.

References

Avignon